Body art is art made on, with, or consisting of, the human body. Body art covers a wide spectrum including tattoos, body piercings, scarification, and body painting. Body art may include performance art, body art is likewise utilized for investigations of the body in an assortment of different media including painting, casting, photography, film and video. More extreme body art can involve mutilation or pushing the body to its physical limits.

In more recent times, the body has become a subject of much broader discussion and treatment than can be reduced to body art in its common understanding. Important strategies that question the human body are: implants, body in symbiosis with the new technologies, virtual bodies, among others.

Background
Body art often deals with issues of gender and personal identity and common topics include the relationship of body and psyche.  

The Vienna Action Group was formed in 1965 by Hermann Nitsch, Otto Mühl, Günter Brus, and Rudolf Schwarzkogler. They performed several body art actions, usually involving social taboos (such as genital mutilation). Vito Acconci once documented, through photos and text, his daily exercise routine of stepping on and off a chair for as long as possible over several months. Acconci also performed Following Piece, in which he followed randomly chosen New Yorkers.

In France, body art was termed art corporel and practiced by such artists as Michel Journiac and Gina Pane. 
In Italy in the 1980s, one of the famous artists in the movement was Ketty La Rocca.

Marina Abramović performed Rhythm 0 in 1974. In the piece, the audience was given instructions to use on Abramović's body an array of 72 provided instruments of pain and pleasure, including knives, feathers, and a loaded pistol. Audience members cut her, pressed thorns into her belly, applied lipstick to her, and removed her clothes. The performance ended after six hours, when someone held the loaded pistol up to Abramović's head and a scuffle broke out.

Photographer Spencer Tunick is well known for conducting photo shoots which gather large numbers of naked people at public locations around the world.

Artists whose works have evolved with more directed personal mythologies include Rebecca Horn, Youri Messen-Jaschin,  Javier Perez, and Jana Sterbak. 
Body art can also be expressed via writing rather than painting.

Extreme body art

For example, one of Marina Abramović's works involved dancing until she collapsed from exhaustion, while one of Dennis Oppenheim's better-known works saw him lying in the sunlight with a book on his chest, until his skin, excluding that covered by the book, was badly sunburned. It can even consist of the arrangement and dissection of preserved bodies in an artistic fashion, as was for the  plastinated bodies used in the travelling Body Worlds exhibition.

Absence of body
Scientific research in this area, for example that by Stelarc, can be considered in this artistic vein. A special case of the body art strategies is the absence of body. Some artists who performed the "absence" of body through their artworks were: Davor Džalto, Antony Gormley, and Andy Warhol.

Body art events
Burning Man festival is held annually in the Black Rock Desert of northwest Nevada (US), in September. 
Jake Lloyd Jones, a Sydney-based artist, conceived the Sydney Body Art Ride, which has become an annual event. Participants are painted to form a living rainbow that rides to the Pacific Ocean and immerses itself in the waves.

Medical uses for body art 
Body art, specifically painting on the body is a newly incorporated skill in the medical industry primarily used for schooling. While the primary method for learning bodily physiology is through examining cadavers according to Gabrielle Flinn, some students are very off put by this practice. Organizations are now considering using body painting as a functional, low-cost, and positive way of learning about the inner-workings of anatomical structures through painting. This would consist of medical students painting on, or working with, willing volunteers who have been painted on to expose various body parts such as: lungs, muscles in hands, legs, etc. Hands are the most typically chosen as the patient does not have to undress for the painting examination, however, with consent of the volunteer patient, medical students could paint other areas such as the back. This would allow the medical students to not only learn more about anatomy in a positive manner, but have real life practice in bedside manners, and making sure their patients are comfortable, and well taken care of through the entire process.

See also

 Body modification
 Cyborg art
 Female cosmetic coalitions
 Mehndi
 Modern primitive
 Performance art 
 Temporary tattoos
 Vajazzle

References

External links

 
 
 
 Body Art section at the Australian Museum
Body Art Page, National Institute for Occupational Safety and Health, Centers for Disease Control and Prevention

 
Visual arts genres
Body modification